Ivor Forbes Guest DUniv MA FRAD (14 April 1920 – 30 March 2018) was a British historian and writer, best known for his study of ballet. He was chairman of the Royal Academy of Dance for twenty three years (1970–93) and has been a Vice-President since 1993 and Secretary then Trustee of the Radcliffe Trust. In 1997 he was made a Doctor of the University by the University of Surrey, its highest honorary doctorate.

He was married to the movement notation expert Ann Hutchinson Guest and acted as a trustee of the Language of Dance Centre, which she founded.

Early life

Ivor Guest was born on 14 April 1920 in Chislehurst, Kent, England. Guest's father, Cecil Marmaduke Guest served as a lieutenant in the Transvaal Scottish in the First World War and was later made up to captain, serving with the South African Scottish in France, where he was gassed. Declared unfit for further service he remained in England. He married Ivor's mother, Christian Forbes-Tweedie on 30 July 1918.

Ballet historian
Guest's first book, Napoleon III in England (1952), came from an interest in his birth town's association with the exiled Napoleon III. Then, despite a successful career as a lawyer, Guest spent holidays and other leisure time researching the ballet of the Second Empire in the archives of the Bibliothèque de l'Opéra in Paris, producing two volumes on the subject entitled The Ballet of the Second Empire (1953, 1955).

He received tributes in Dance Research: The Journal of the Society for Dance Research in 1995, the year of his 75th birthday;  and in Dance Chronicle in 2001. Guest died in London on 30 March 2018, two weeks before his 98th birthday.

Publications
Guest's writing focuses primarily on the ballet in Paris, at the Opéra, in the years 1770 to 1870. He also chronicles the international careers of some of ballet's stars.

Ballet
 The Ballet of the Second Empire, A. and C. Black (1953) ASIN B0007ITA5G
 Fanny Cerrito: Life of a Romantic Ballerina, London: Phoenix House, (1956)
 Victorian ballet-girl,: The tragic story of Clara Webster, A. and C. Black (1957), 136 pages ASIN B0006AVBAM
 Adeline Genée: a lifetime of ballet under six reigns; based on the personal reminiscences of Dame Adeline Genée-Isitt, D.B.E., A. and C. Black, 1958, 207 pages
 The Alhambra ballet, Dance Perspectives, inc., 1959, 72 pages
 The Dancer's Heritage: A Short History of Ballet, Adam & Charles Black; First Edition & First Printing edition (1 Jan 1960), 
 La fille mal gardée, Dancing Times, 1960, 71 pages
 Dandies and dancers, Dance Perspectives Foundation, 1969, 49 pages
 Fanny Elssler, A & C Black Publishers Ltd (28 May 1970), 284 pages 
 Romantic Ballet in England, Pitman Publishing; 2nd Revised edition (27 June 1972), 195 pages 
 Letters from a Ballet Master: The Correspondence of Arthur Saint-Léon (1981), 158 pages 
 Adventures of a Ballet Historian, Dance Horizons; 1st edition (28 March 1983), 131 pages 
 Jules Perrot, Princeton Book Company Publishers (December 1984), 383 pages 
 Ballet in Leicester Square: The Alhambra and the Empire 1860–1915, Dance Books (May 1992), 192 pages 
 The Ballet of the Enlightenment: The Establishment of the Ballet D'Action in France, 1770–1793, Princeton Book Company Publishers (February 1997), 456 pages 
 Ballet Under Napoleon, Dance Horizons (May 2002), 584 pages 
 The Paris Opera Ballet, Princeton Book Co Pub (30 April 2006), 160 pages 
 The Romantic Ballet in Paris, Dance Books Ltd (1 February 2008), 472 pages 
 The Divine Virginia: Biography of Virginia Zucchi, Dance Books (10 July 2008), 204 pages

Other history
 Napoleon III in England, London, British Technical and General Press; 1st Edition. edition (1 Jan 1952), 212 pages ASIN B0006DASOE
 Dr. John Radcliffe and his Trust, Radcliffe Trust, 1991, 595 pages

Honours
In 1997, he was awarded the Queen Elizabeth II Coronation Award for services to ballet which is the RAD's highest honour; he was given a Lifetime Achievement Award. In 2000 he received the Ordre des Arts et des Lettres.

See also

Le Corsaire
La fille mal gardée
Fanny Elssler
Marius Petipa
Cesare Pugni
Palais Garnier
Virginia Zucchi
Her Majesty's Theatre

References 

1920 births
2018 deaths
British historians
English solicitors
British male writers
People from Chislehurst